Su-ngai Kolok is a border town, subdistrict, and district on the Malaysia-Thailand Border in Narathiwat Province, Thailand. It is one of the largest and most prosperous districts in Narathiwat Province. It is also one of the major economic centers in the southern part of Thailand. It is capital of the Su-ngai Kolok District. As of 2005, the town (thesaban mueang) had a population of 38,612. Across the border is Rantau Panjang, Kelantan, Malaysia.

Geography
Su-ngai Kolok is in the southeastern part of the province. Adjacent areas are: in the north is Su-ngai Padi and Tak Bai; in the east, Kelantan (Malaysia); in the south, Kelantan (Malaysia) and Wan; in the west Su-ngai Padi.

Etymology
The word "su-ngai" is Malay and means 'river'. Golok is also Malay and means 'traditional sword'. Therefore, Su-ngai Golok means 'sword river'.

History
The township was upgraded to town (thesaban mueang) status on 20 February 2004.

References

External links

kolokcity.net
Islamic insurgency in Thailand’s strangest party town

Populated places in Narathiwat province
Malaysia–Thailand border crossings
Cities and towns in Thailand